William Orser Holmes (February 9, 1899 – March 14, 1961) was a Canadian ice hockey centre who played 51 games in the National Hockey League (NHL) for the Montreal Canadiens and the New York Americans between 1925 and 1930. The rest of his career, which lasted from 1921 to 1936, was spent in various minor leagues.

Born in Portage la Prairie, a city in the Central Plains Region of Manitoba.

Career statistics

Regular season and playoffs

External links
 

1899 births
1961 deaths
Buffalo Majors players
Canadian expatriate ice hockey players in the United States
Canadian ice hockey centres
Cleveland Indians (IHL) players
Edmonton Eskimos (ice hockey) players
Ice hockey people from Manitoba
London Panthers players
London Tecumsehs players
Montreal Canadiens players
New Haven Eagles players
New York Americans players
Niagara Falls Cataracts players
Pittsburgh Shamrocks players
Pittsburgh Yellow Jackets (IHL) players
Sportspeople from Portage la Prairie
Syracuse Stars (IHL) players